Marie of Saint Just, born Anne-Françoise Moreau (9 April 1866 - 9 July 1900) was a French nun in the Franciscan Missionaries of Mary. She was one of the 120 Martyrs of China. She died in the province of Shanxi. .

During the Boxer Rebellion, she was killed on 9 July 1900 at Taiyuan. John Paul II canonized her on 1 October 2000.

Life
She was born in 1866.

In 1899 she was one of a group of seven sisters from the order of the Franciscan Missionaries of Mary who went to Taiyuan, China, arriving on 4 May 1899, to help at an orphanage at the mission there under bishop Gregorio Grassi. At the orphanage, which soon cared for 200 children. Their Mother Superior was Marie-Hermine of Jesus.

On 5 July 1900, during the Boxer Rebellion, the Christians at the mission were ordered to renounce their faith or face death; at 4pm on 9 July the priests, nuns, seminarians and Christian lay workers were all killed, in what is known as the Taiyuan massacre. It is estimated that 250 foreigners died during the Boxer rebellion. Some of these were embassy staff, but most were missionaries. It is thought that 100,000 Chinese people may have died.

Marie of Saint Just was beatified by Pope Pius XII on 24 November 1946 and later canonised by on 1 October 2000.

References 

Breton saints
1900 deaths
1866 births
19th-century French nuns
Christian female saints of the Late Modern era
Canonizations by Pope John Paul II
Franciscan Missionaries of Mary
People from Loire-Atlantique
People executed by decapitation
19th-century Roman Catholic martyrs
French people of the Boxer Rebellion
19th-century Christian saints